Formiana is a genus of moths in the family Geometridae described by Druce in 1885.

References

Sterrhinae